The Journal of Biomedical Semantics is a peer-reviewed open-access scientific journal that covers biomedical semantics.

History
It was established in 2010 and is published by BioMed Central. The editors-in-chief are Dietrich Rebholz-Schuhmann (University of Zurich) and Goran Nenadic (University of Manchester). The journal is abstracted and indexed in Scopus, Science Citation Index Expanded, and BIOSIS Previews.

References

External links 
 

Biomedical informatics journals
Creative Commons Attribution-licensed journals
BioMed Central academic journals
Publications established in 2010
English-language journals